Freepik is an image bank website. Content produced and distributed by the online platform includes photographs, illustrations and vector images. The platform distributes its content under a freemium model, which means that users can access much of the content for free, but it is also possible to purchase a subscription with advantages such as access to more exclusive resources, the option of not attributing the content used or a higher number of daily downloads.

Freepik was founded in 2010 in Malaga with the idea of providing free graphic resources to designers around the world. The Spanish stock image platform is used by several million users, including multinationals such as Microsoft, FedEx, Amazon or Spotify.

The platform is part of the Freepik Company, a company that has been chosen by the Financial Times as one of the thirty fastest growing companies on the European continent. Freepik Company is the parent brand of four other creative platforms: Flaticon, Slidesgo, Storyset and Wepik.

The content of Freepik Company products is created by the company's designers and its more than 21,000 collaborators of more than 100 countries, and downloads of its content reach an average of more than 80 million per month.

In 2020, the Swedish investment firm EQT acquired a majority stake in Freepik Company.

In 2022, Freepik was named in G2's Best Software 2022 Awards, ranking 17th on the list of best-selling software in Europe, the Middle East and Africa and 43rd in the list of best design products.

History 
Freepik was founded in 2010 by brothers Alejandro Sánchez and Pablo Blanes, together with their friend Joaquín Cuenca, founder of Panoramio (acquired by Google). Initially it was a search engine that indexed content from the top 10 free content websites for designers.

In 2014, Freepik stopped being 
In 2015 the subscription model was launched. Users who pay for a Premium account have access to more resources and exclusive content on the platform, without the need to attribute. In addition, the Contributors model has also started: designers and photographers can upload their assets to the platform and earn income from them. 

In 2018 Freepik changed its visual identity introduced a new logo. This redesign included a new font, a modified isotype, as well as the color palette. The objective of this change was to redefine the brand image and bring it closer to graphic design trends.

In 2020 during the Coronavirus outbreak, as part of a Freepik Company CSR initiative, Freepik offered its resources free of charge to healthcare workers, educators, journalists, and workers in public institutions.

Subsidiaries 
Freepik Company is the parent brand of 4 other creative platforms:
Flaticon, 
Slidesgo,
Storyset
Wepik

References

External links 
 

2000 establishments in Spain
Companies based in Calgary
Internet properties established in 2000
Online content distribution
Crowdsourcing
Getty Images
Online companies of Spain
Privately held companies of Spain
Stock photography